RTVC Sistema de Medios Públicos (abbreviation of Radio Televisión Nacional de Colombia, known by its acronym  'RTVC' ) is a public radio and television entity of Colombia, created by Decree 3525 of October 28, 2004, by dissolving Inravisión and its public production company Audiovisuales, under the government of President Álvaro Uribe Vélez.

RTVC is a state entity, linked to the Ministry of Information Technologies and Communications and its function is to produce, program and operate state radio and television services, such as Señal Colombia, Canal Institucional, Radio Nacional de Colombia and Radiónica. In addition, it manages a network of eight state channels with regional coverage.

With the refocusing of RTVC's administration, the entity launched the web stations Signal Classic and Signal Llanera. In addition, it has the Memoria Signal platform, whose programming is made up of the audiovisual archives of radio and television in Colombia, and RTVCPlay OTT Service, the free entertainment content platform.
Currently RTVC also has RTVC Noticias, everyone's newscast, with information on Colombia and its regions in its own accent.

Services 
RTVC owns four free-to-air television stations (one of which is managed by private businesses) and two radio networks.

Television

Terrestrial television 
RTVC has 2 channels of national coverage.

National channels 
RTVC is responsible for the operations of the 2 national channels, which have 97% of their coverage.

Regional channels 
It is also responsible for the operations of the 2 regional channels, both broadcasting in departments of the country located in the regions of the Andes, the Llanos and the Amazon.

Radio 
RTVC broadcasts 2 stations, on various frequencies nationwide. These, in turn, have 4 specialized thematic stations.

OTT

External links
SCSMP's Official site 
SCSMP's Official site 
Radiónica's Official site 
Señal Radio Colombia's Official site 
Señal Colombia's Official site 
Canal Institucional's Official site 

Radio in Colombia
Television in Colombia
Communications in Colombia
Publicly funded broadcasters
Radio stations established in 1940
Television channels and stations established in 1954
Television channels and stations established in 2004
Radio stations established in 2004
Ministry of Information Technologies and Communications (Colombia)
State media